A transforming robot is a robot that can change to take the appearance or form of another object. This type of robot was a very popular toy concept in the 1980s; such toy robots could morph to resemble everyday objects, machines, or animals, and vice versa.

Toylines that used this concept include:
 Transformers (by Hasbro and Takara Tomy), a very popular franchise with two robot factions that fought against each other. The robots could transform into a wide range of things, from insects to airplanes.
 Gobots and Machine Robo (Tonka, Bandai), mostly die-cast toy robots that could transform into machines like cars, boats and airplanes.
 Rock Lords (Tonka, Bandai), robots that could transform into rocks.
 NEO Shifters (Mattel, Mega Brands), robots that could transform into flying spheres
 Changeables, or McRobots, an attempt by McDonald's to capitalize on the transforming robot boom. These robots could transform into company products such as french fries or hamburgers.
 Escaflowne Figures were incredibly popular in Japan in 2005.  They changed from a humanoid into a dragon.
 Switch & Go Dinos by (VTech), vehicles which transform into dinosaurs.
 Diarobo (ダイヤロボ) by (Agatsuma Ltd), Road vehicles changed into humans, animals and dinosaurs.
 The variable fighter from the popular Macross franchise.
 The Convertors toys featured the conflict between heroic and evil factions, in this case the heroic Defenders (and their Avarian allies) and the evil Maladroids (and their Insectors allies).

 
1980s toys
Super robot anime and manga